Elizabeth Jane "Jenny" Heathcote was a professor of medicine at the University of Toronto and a gastroenterologist and scientist at University Health Network in Toronto specializing in liver disease. She retired in 2013.

After graduating from the Royal Free Hospital School of medicine in London in 1968, Heathcote trained with Dame Professor Sheila Sherlock on the transmission of Hepatitis B. She then trained at Stanford before moving from there to Toronto in 1979, where she developed an internationally recognized liver clinical research unit, housed at University Health Network. Her contributions to hepatology include seminal work on the natural history of autoimmune hepatitis, variant and overlap syndromes of autoimmune hepatitis, treatment of primary biliary cirrhosis and treatment of viral hepatitis. Her scientific contributions to liver disease have been recognized with numerous awards, most notably by the American Association for the Study of Liver Diseases who awarded her the Distinguished Achievement Award in 2005, and by the University Health Network who awarded her the UHN Global Impact Award in 2015.

Publications

References

External links
 Biography, The International Liver Congress 2016

Canadian gastroenterologists
Living people
Year of birth missing (living people)
Academic staff of the University of Toronto